Solomon Feferman (December 13, 1928 – July 26, 2016) was an American philosopher and mathematician who worked in mathematical logic.

Life
Solomon Feferman was born in The Bronx in New York City to working-class parents who had immigrated to the United States after World War I and had met and married in New York. Neither parent had any advanced education.  The family moved to Los Angeles, where Feferman graduated from high school at age 16.

He received his B.S. from the California Institute of Technology in 1948, and in 1957 his Ph.D. in mathematics from the University of California, Berkeley, under Alfred Tarski, after having been drafted and having served in the U.S. Army from 1953 to 1955. In 1956 he was appointed to the Departments of Mathematics and Philosophy at Stanford University, where he later became the Patrick Suppes Professor of Humanities and Sciences.

Feferman died on 26 July 2016 at his home in Stanford, following an illness that lasted three months and a stroke. At his death, he had been a member of the MAA for 37 years.

Contributions
Feferman was editor-in-chief of the five-volume Collected Works of Kurt Gödel, published by Oxford University Press between 2001 and 2013.

In 2004, together with his wife Anita Burdman Feferman, he published a biography of Alfred Tarski: Alfred Tarski: Life and Logic.

He worked on predicative mathematics, in particular introducing the Feferman–Schütte ordinal as a measure of the strength of certain predicative systems.

Recognition
Feferman was awarded a Guggenheim Fellowship in 1972 and 1986 and the Rolf Schock Prize in logic and philosophy in 2003. He was invited to give the Gödel Lecture in 1997 and the Tarski Lectures in 2006. In 2012 he became a fellow of the American Mathematical Society.

Publications

Papers
Feferman, Solomon; Vaught, Robert L. (1959), "The first order properties of products of algebraic systems", Fund. Math. 47, 57–103.
Feferman, Solomon (1975), "A language and axioms for explicit mathematics", Algebra and logic (Fourteenth Summer Res. Inst., Austral. Math. Soc., Monash Univ., Clayton, 1974), pp. 87–139, Lecture Notes in Math., vol. 450, Berlin, Springer.
Feferman, Solomon (1979), "Constructive theories of functions and classes", Logic Colloquium '78 (Mons, 1978), pp. 159–224, Stud. Logic Foundations Math., 97, Amsterdam, New York, North-Holland.
Buchholz, Wilfried; Feferman, Solomon; Pohlers, Wolfram; Sieg, Wilfried (1981), "Iterated inductive definitions and subsystems of analysis: recent proof-theoretical studies", Lecture Notes in Mathematics, 897, Berlin, New York, Springer-Verlag.
Feferman, Solomon; Hellman, Geoffrey (1995), "Predicative foundations of arithmetic", J. Philos. Logic 24 (1), 1–17.
Avigad, Jeremy; Feferman, Solomon (1998), "Gödel's functional (Dialectica) interpretation", Handbook of proof theory, 337–405, Stud. Logic Found. Math., 137, Amsterdam, North-Holland.

Books
Feferman, Solomon. (1998). In the Light of Logic. Oxford University Press. , Logic and Computation in Philosophy series.

See also
Criticism of non-standard analysis

References

External links
 Solomon Feferman official website (via Internet Archive) at Stanford University

1928 births
21st-century  American mathematicians
American logicians
Jewish American scientists
Jewish philosophers
Mathematical logicians
American historians of mathematics
University of California, Berkeley alumni
Rolf Schock Prize laureates
Stanford University Department of Philosophy faculty
Stanford University Department of Mathematics faculty
Philosophers of mathematics
Fellows of the American Mathematical Society
Tarski lecturers
2016 deaths
21st-century American Jews
Gödel Lecturers
20th-century  American mathematicians